Florent Michel Marie Joseph du Bois de La Villerabel (29 September 1877 in St. Brieuc – 7 February 1951 in St. Brieuc), archbishop of Aix, Arles and Embrun (1940–1944), was the most prominent of seven French mainland or colonial bishops who in the aftermath of the Liberation were obliged to submit their resignations to Pope Pius XII. It had been suggested that more prelates should resign, but the diplomatic skills of the nuncio Mgr Roncalli reduced the resignations, together with the appointment of a coadjutor to Msgr Serrand, bishop of St. Brieuc and Tréguier, and the exclusion of the then archbishops of Reims and Bordeaux from any future appointments as cardinals.

Villerabel had notably opposed La Voix du Vatican, which was critical of the Vichy government, leading to a disagreement with Cardinal Suhard. His retirement (when he resumed his former titulature of Aenos or Enos which he had held as auxiliary bishop to the archbishop of Tours from 1920 to 1940) was spent at Solesmes Abbey and at St. Brieuc.

Other bishops obliged to resign included Msgrs. Dutoit of Arras, Auvity of Mende, and Beaussart, auxiliary of Paris (who ironically had welcomed General De Gaulle at Notre-Dame in 1944 in place of Cardinal Suhard, the archbishop, who was not at that particular moment in the General's favours).

Villerabel had been consecrated by his cousin, bishop of Amiens, subsequently Archbishop of Rouen and Primate of Normandy, a post from which he resigned in 1936 after a case of embezzlement by a priest on his staff.

Sources
Etienne Fouilloux (ed.): Angelo Roncalli-Giovanni XXIII, Journal de France vol. 1, 2006

Archbishops of Aix
1877 births
1951 deaths
French collaborators with Nazi Germany